Exco International was a leading British money brokering company. It was listed on the London Stock Exchange and was once a constituent of the FTSE 100 Index but was acquired by British & Commonwealth Holdings in 1986.

History
The Company was established as a money brokering business in 1965 under the name of Astley & Pearce. It subsequently merged with Godsell & Co, another money brokering business.

In 1978 it was the subject of a management buyout from Gerrard & National who previously owned it. It was first listed on the London Stock Exchange in 1981.

The Company was acquired by British & Commonwealth Holdings in 1986.

When British & Commonwealth Holdings collapsed the business was sold off as Exco plc. In 1998 it acquired Intercapital plc in a reverse takeover. It has now been integrated into the ICAP Group.

References

Financial services companies based in London
Financial services companies established in 1965
Financial services companies disestablished in 1998
1965 establishments in England
1998 disestablishments in England
Companies formerly listed on the London Stock Exchange